Myles Gal (born 21 June 2000) is a Greece international rugby league footballer who plays for the Sunshine Coast Falcons.

Playing career
In 2022, Gal was named in the Greece squad for the 2021 Rugby League World Cup, the first ever Greek Rugby League squad to compete in a World Cup.

References

External links
Greek profile

2000 births
Living people
Australian rugby league players
Australian people of Greek descent
Greece national rugby league team players
Rugby league players from Bundaberg
Rugby league props
Sunshine Coast Falcons players